The Argentine Civil Wars were a series of civil conflicts of varying intensity that took place through the territories of Argentina from 1814 to 1853. Initiation concurrently with the Argentine War of Independence (1810–1820), the conflict prevented the formation of a stable governing body until the signing of the Argentine Constitution of 1853, followed by low frequency skirmishes that ended with the Federalization of Buenos Aires. 
The period saw heavy intervention from the Brazilian Empire that fought against state and provinces in multiple wars. Breakaway nations, former territories of the viceroyalty such as the Banda Oriental, Paraguay and the Alto Peru were involved to varying degrees. Foreign powers such as British and French empires put heavy pressure on the fledging nations at times of international war.

Initially conflict arose from tensions over the organization and powers of the United Provinces of South America. The May 1810 revolution sparked the breakdown of the Viceroyalty's Intendencies (regional administrations) into local Cabildos. These rejected the notion that the central government should be able to instate and remove governors of the new provinces; a general opposition to centralism. Escalation resulted in the dissolution of the Directorship and the congress leaving the Argentine provinces under the leadership of personalist strongmen called Caudillos, leading to sporadic skirmishes until the reestablishment of relative peace after the war between the League of the Interior and the Federal Pact. However, conflicting interests did not permit the creation of a governing body until the Pact's defeat during the Platine War. 
Later conflicts centered around commercial control of the riverways in the Paraná and Uruguay Rivers and the country's only port, which saw the secession of Buenos Aires from the Argentine Confederation, its unification and subsequent de-escalation of hostilities as the battleground moved from mutinies to debates within the political system of the Argentine Republic.

Overview

The Federal League and The Anarchy of the 1820s 
Regionalism had long marked the relationship among the numerous provinces of what today is Argentina, and the wars of independence did not result in national unity. José Artigas' establishment of the Federal League with Banda Oriental Province, Entre Ríos Province, Corrientes Province, Misiones Province, and Córdoba Province, in June 1814, marked the first formal rupture in the United Provinces of South America that had been created by the 1810 May Revolution.

The Banda Oriental was invaded in June 1816 by Portuguese Empire, a conflict that tied Artigas' army to the defense of the region. Nonetheless, he ordered an armed response against the Directorship of the United Provinces' declaration of the centralising Argentine Constitution of 1819. The Federal League victory at the Battle of Cepeda (1820) effectively dissolved the government, leaving caudillos as the highest regional authorities for the remainder of the decade. The Treaty of Pilar between Buenos Aires, Sante Fe and Entre Ríos, and the subsequent refusal of fellow Federal members to aid the occupied Banda Oriental marked the dissolution of the Federal League.

Armed conflict between Littoral governors soared in the beginning of the 1820s, immediately following the downfall of the Federal League. Artigas rejected the Pilar treaty and signed the Avalos Treaty with the governments of Corrientes and Misiones. In May 1820 he marched his army towards Concepción del Uruguay in Entre Ríos, but was ultimately defeated at Misiones by September, and exiled to Asunción. The governor of Entre Ríos, Francisco Ramírez effectively occupied the provinces of Corrientes and Misiones. The signing of the Treaty of Benegas in November 1820 between Buenos Aires and Santa Fe led to the breakdown of relations between Ramírez and Santa Fe's governor Estanislao López. By 1821 a war between the Buenos Aires-Santa Fe alliance and Corrientes ended in the death of Ramírez and the signing of the defensive Quadrilateral Treaty between Buenos Aires, Santa Fe, Entre Ríos and Corrientes against the Brazilian-Portuguese.

Federal Congress of the United Provinces 

Fear of further Brazilian aggression led the provinces to agree for a federal congress in 1824. In a number of sessions, the congress drafted a "Fundamental law" temporarily appointing the governor of Buenos Aires Province as head of state until the formal establishment of such an office. Subsequent sessions saw reinvigorated support of the Banda Oriental's resistance against Brazil, culminating in the formal reintegration of the province after the Uruguay's declaration of independence at the congress of Florida on 25 August 1825. In response, Brazil declared war on the United Provinces on 10 December 1825, prompting the enactment of the presidency and the election of Bernardino Rivadavia as its first president in order to coordinate the new Argentine army, despite objections from the representatives of Buenos Aires, Entre Ríos and Santa Fe over port rights. Rivadavia and his followers heavily pushed for reforms intended to set up the basis of a federal level government and successfully passed the Argentine Constitution of 1826, denounced by congress representatives as centralist in nature.

Although initially successful, the war stagnated and poorly led negotiations in 1827 discredited the central government. Facing opposition on all fronts, Rivadavia resigned and vice-president Vicente López y Planes soon followed his example. Elections were held in Buenos Aires where the opposition leader Manuel Dorrego was elected Governor of Buenos Aires as the only candidate contesting. His peace negotiations with Brazil faced heavy pressure from the British Empire who saw continued war as a threat to its trade networks. Mediated through Britain, the August 1828 Preliminary Peace Convention affirmed the independence of the Banda Oriental, a result not expected by the local population. The ensuing outrage prompted returning officer Juan Lavalle to stage a coup on behalf of the Unitarians in December 1828, executing Dorrego and dissolving the second republic of the United Provinces. Federalist rancher Juan Manuel de Rosas rose in revolt and defeated the coup.

Liga del Interior and Pacto Federal 

Beginning from 1829, two cliques that came to be named by contemporaries as Federalists and Unitarians took shape. In that year Juan Manuel de Rosas assumed governorship of Buenos Aires after forcing Lavalle's surrender. In Cordoba, the pro-Lavalle minister José María Paz began a campaign of subjugation against the interior provinces. In his writings he denounced provincial governors, especially those of the littoral, calling them Caudillos, and accused the anti-centralising interior provinces of a colonial mindset, holding them responsible for the country's disorganized state and ultimately the stagnation of the independence war efforts and the collapse of the Army of the North. His campaign against settlements in western Argentina found little opposition with the exception of Mendoza's Caudillo Juan Facundo Quiroga, who he defeated in a series of skirmishes. Paz set his sights on removing Caudillo influence from the cities, ordering a series of purges and expropriations of deposed governors such as the Quiroga family.

On July 5, 1830, the Unitarian Liga del Interior was formally entreated as a military alliance, albeit with all local governors supplanted with Paz's followers. In response, on January 4, 1831, the provinces of Buenos Aires, Santa Fe, Corrientes and Entre Ríos established the Federal Pact, in reference to Artigas' original proposal for a federal system to replace the viceroyalty system. Hostilities between the two alliances began in May that year, ending with the defeat of the Unitarian League at the Battle of La Ciudadela. Juan Lavalle continued the conflict through a series of rebellions with different alliances against Rosas and the Federal Pact until Lavalle's defeat and assassination in 1841.

The Federal Pact made no attempt at creating a centralized government. Provinces such as Corrientes considered the pact dissolved by 1834, having attained its goals. Representation on foreign affairs was assumed by the far larger Buenos Aires province with provincial governors formally delegating to Rosas' government. In addition, Rosas was symbolically granted the "Sum of public power", suspending the separation of powers. These powers also enabled Rosas to participate in the protracted Uruguayan Civil War in favor of Blancos leader Manuel Oribe, though unsuccessfully; Oribe, in turn, led numerous military campaigns on behalf of Rosas, and became an invaluable ally in the struggle against Lavalle and other Unitarians. Beginning with Rosas' 1835 governorship mandate, this arrangement began to be called the Argentine Confederation, albeit amid ongoing conflicts, interventionism and rising local and international tensions. The Peru–Bolivian Confederation declared the War of the Confederation against Chile and Argentina. Justo José de Urquiza, governor of Entre Ríos, led the other provinces to demand the drafting of a constitution and sharing of customs authority and export income. The Platine War saw a Brazilian-led alliance of Colorado Uruguayan, dissident Federalist and Paraguayan elements defeating the Argentine-Uruguayan army in 1852 at the Battle of Caseros, when Rosas was deposed and exiled.

Secession of Buenos Aires 

The central figure in the overthrow of Rosas, Entre Ríos Governor Justo José de Urquiza, failed to secure Buenos Aires' ratification of the 1852 San Nicolás Agreement for a new constitution. Following this, Buenos Aires Unitarians launched the Revolution of 11 September 1852, and the State of Buenos Aires was declared. The secessionist state rejected the 1853 Constitution of Argentina, and promulgated its own the following year. The most contentious issue remained the Buenos Aires Customs, which remained under the control of the city government and was the chief source of public revenue. Nations with which the Confederation maintained foreign relations, moreover, kept all embassies in Buenos Aires (rather than in the capital, Paraná).

The State of Buenos Aires was also bolstered by its numerous alliances in the hinterland, including that of Santiago del Estero Province (led by Manuel Taboada), as well as among powerful Unitarian Party governors in Salta, Corrientes, Tucumán and San Juan. The 1858 assassination of San Juan's Federalist governor, Nazario Benavídez, by Unitarians inflamed tensions between the Confederation and the State of Buenos Aires, as did a free trade agreement between the chief Confederate port (the Port of Rosario) and the Port of Montevideo, which undermined Buenos Aires trade. The election of the intransigent Valentín Alsina further exacerbated disputes, which culminated in the Battle of Cepeda (1859).

Buenos Aires forces, led by General Bartolomé Mitre, were defeated by those led by the President of Argentina, Justo José de Urquiza. Ordered to subjugate Buenos Aires separatists by force, Urquiza instead invited the defeated to a round of negotiations, and secured the Pact of San José de Flores, which provided for a number of constitutional amendments and led to other concessions, including an extension on the province's customs house concession and measures benefiting the Bank of the Province of Buenos Aires, whose currency was authorized for use as legal tender at the customs house (thereby controlling much of the nation's foreign trade).

Mitre ultimately abrogated the Pact of San José, leading to renewed civil war. These hostilities culminated in the 1861 Battle of Pavón, and to victory on the part of Mitre and Buenos Aires over Urquiza's national forces. President Santiago Derqui, who had been backed by Urquiza, resigned on November 4, 1861. Mitre's forces captured more than half of the interior provinces, and replaced their Federalist governments with Unitarians. Mitre, who despite victory reaffirmed his commitment to the 1860 constitutional amendments, was elected the republic's first president in 1862.

National unification
President Mitre instituted a limited suffrage electoral system known as the voto cantado ("intoned vote"), which depended on a pliant electoral college and would be conditioned to prevent the election of secessionists to high office through electoral fraud, if necessary. The 1874 election victory of the National Autonomist Party's Catamarca Province-born Nicolás Avellaneda, who had been endorsed by an erstwhile Buenos Aires separatist, Adolfo Alsina, led to renewed fighting when Mitre mutinied a gunboat to prevent the inaugural. He was defeated, however, and only President Avellaneda's commutation spared his life.

Vestigial opposition to the new order continued from Federalists, notably La Rioja leader Chacho Peñaloza, who was killed in 1863 following a long campaign of internecine warfare, and Entre Ríos leader Ricardo López Jordán, whose Jordanist rebellion of 1870 to 1876, starting with the assassination of former Federalist president Justo José de Urquiza (whom he blamed for the Federalist defeat), marked the last Federalist revolt. The 1880 election of the National Autonomist leader of Conquest of the Desert, General Julio Roca, led to a final armed insurrection by Buenos Aires Governor Carlos Tejedor, a die-hard opponent of the Federalization of Buenos Aires and the resulting lost of privileges. Its quick defeat and a truce brokered by Mitre quieted the last source of open resistance to national unity (Buenos Aires autonomists), and resulted in the Federalization of Buenos Aires, as well as the hegemony of Roca's PAN and pro-modernization Generation of '80 policy makers over national politics until 1916.

Main conflicts

 War between the Supreme Director of the United Provinces of the Río de la Plata and José Artigas' League of the Free Peoples (1814–1820)
 Battle of Cepeda (1820)
 Conflicts with La Rioja leader Facundo Quiroga (1826–1835)
 Federalist war against the Unitarian League (1831)
 Revolution of the Restorers against Buenos Aires Governor Juan Ramón Balcarce (1833)
 Conflicts with La Rioja leader Chacho Peñaloza (1835–1845; 1860–1863)
 French blockade of the Río de la Plata (1838)
 Free Men of the South revolt, quelled at Chascomús in 1839
 Pedro Ferré's Corrientes revolt (1839–1842)
 Involvement in the Uruguayan Civil War by Rosas on behalf of Manuel Oribe (1839–1851)
 War with the Northern Coalition (1840–1841)
 Juan Lavalle's revolt against Juan Manuel de Rosas (1841)
 Battle of Caaguazú and defeat of Unitarian forces in Corrientes (1841)
 Joaquín Madariaga's Corrientes revolt (1843–1847)
 Battle of Vuelta de Obligado (1845) and Anglo-French blockade of the Río de la Plata (1845–1850)
 Entre Ríos leader Justo José de Urquiza's break with Rosas (1851)
 Battle of Caseros (1852)
 Revolution of 11 September 1852, creating the State of Buenos Aires
 Siege of Buenos Aires (1852–1853)
 Battle of Cepeda (1859)
 Battle of Pavón (1861)
 Felipe Varela's Revolución de los Colorados in Catamarca and other western provinces (1867)
 Entre Ríos leader Ricardo López Jordán's rebellion (1870–1876)
 Bartolomé Mitre's insurrection against Autonomist Party and President-elect Nicolás Avellaneda (1874)
 Buenos Aires Governor Carlos Tejedor's rebellion against President-elect Julio Roca (1880)

See also
Rise of the Republic of Argentina
United Provinces of the Río de la Plata
Argentine Confederation

References

Levene, Ricardo. A History of Argentina. University of North Carolina Press, 1937.
Luna, Félix. Los caudillos. Buenos Aires: Editorial Peña Lillo, 1971.
Historical Dictionary of Argentina. London: Scarecrow Press, 1978.

 
Wars involving Argentina
Civil wars involving the states and peoples of South America
Civil wars of the Industrial era